Smif 'n' Wessun: Reloaded is the third studio album by American hip hop duo Smif-N-Wessun, and the only one released under the name Tek & Steele (formerly known as Cocoa Brovaz due to a lawsuit with the Smith & Wesson firearms company in 1995). It was released on September 13, 2005 via Duck Down Music as a part of the label's "Triple Threat Campaign", preceded by Sean Price's Monkey Barz and Buckshot's Chemistry. Production was handled by Da Beatminerz, Coptic, Ken Ring, Khrysis, Rune Rotter, MoSS, Roc Raida and Dru Kevorkian. It features guest appearances from the Boot Camp Clik, Dead Prez, Talib Kweli and Tony Touch. The album peaked at number 69 on the Billboard Top R&B/Hip-Hop Albums chart in the US.

Track listing

Notes
 signifies an additional producer

Personnel

C/4 – engineering, mixing
Christopher "Cesar Comanche" Robinson – engineering, mixing
Christopher "Khrysis" Tyson – engineering, mixing
Dan "The Man" Humiston – engineering, mixing
DJ Mello – engineering, mixing
Dru Kevorkian – engineering, mixing
Eric "Coptic" Matlock – engineering, mixing
Kamel – engineering, mixing
Kieran Walsh – engineering, mixing
Rob "Giambi" Garcia – engineering, mixing
Drew "Dru-Ha" Friedman – executive producer
Kenyatta "Buckshot" Blake – executive producer
Eckō Mindlabs – art direction
Akash Khokha – additional art direction
Romeo Tanghal – cover illustration
Raphael Tanghal – cover illustration
Noel Spirandelli – photography
Noah "Noha" Friedman – marketing

Album singles
"Spit Again" (non-album single, from Soundbombing III)
Released: June 28, 2002
B-Side: "Toolz of the Trade"
"Crystal Stair"
Released: April 29, 2005
B-Side: "Swollen Tank"
"My Timbz Do Work"/"Gunn Rap"
Released: October 28, 2005
B-Side: "Reloaded", "Get Back"

Charts

References

External links

2005 albums
Smif-n-Wessun albums
Duck Down Music albums
Albums produced by MoSS
Albums produced by Khrysis
Albums produced by Da Beatminerz